Dan Stacy is a Missouri politician serving in the Missouri House of Representatives since 2016, after defeating Incumbent Sheila Solon in the primary in the 2016 election. He is a member of the Republican Party.

Missouri House of Representatives

Committee assignments 

 Corrections and Public Institutions
 Elections and Elected Officials
 Elementary and Secondary Education
Source:

Electoral history

References

Living people
Republican Party members of the Missouri House of Representatives
21st-century American politicians
Year of birth missing (living people)